Sir George Humphrey Middleton

 (21 January 1910 – 12 February 1998) was a British diplomat.

He served as the United Kingdom's ambassador to Lebanon (1956–1958), Argentina (1961–1964) and Egypt (1964–1965). He was also Chief Political Resident in the Persian Gulf Residency and Chargé d'affaires in Iran during the Abadan Crisis.

Personal life
He married first in 1934, Elizabeth Rosalie Okeden (Tina) Pockley, the Australian detective novelist Elizabeth Antill. They divorced and he then married  Francoise Sarthou, (1927-2019), an interior decorator and patron of the international charity Children and Families Across Borders. She was formerly married to the French diplomat Philip Dahan-Bouchard.

References
General

Specific

1910 births
1998 deaths
Alumni of Magdalen College, Oxford
Ambassadors of the United Kingdom to Argentina
Ambassadors of the United Kingdom to Lebanon
Ambassadors of the United Kingdom to Egypt
Knights Commander of the Order of St Michael and St George
People educated at St Lawrence College, Ramsgate